Hopedale, also known as La Chinche, is a fishing community located along Bayou La Loutre in St. Bernard Parish, Louisiana. The community was established by Isleño fisherman and trappers following the American Civil War. The community was left completely destroyed following Hurricane Katrina in 2005.

References 

Unincorporated communities in Louisiana
Unincorporated communities in St. Bernard Parish, Louisiana
Louisiana Isleño communities
Unincorporated communities in New Orleans metropolitan area